Be My Baby (known in its original Thai language as Be My Baby – ; lit. Be My Baby - This Kid Me) is a Thai web series of GMMTV currently available for streaming on YouTube and Facebook Watch.

Each episode features two GMMTV artists as they compete with each other in winning over the child to their side through various challenges. The series premiered on 26 November 2019 and aired every 1st, 3rd, and 5th Tuesday of the month. It aired its last episode on 31 March 2020.

Episodes

References

External links 
 Youtube Playlist 
 GMMTV

2019 web series debuts
2020 web series endings
2010s YouTube series
2020s YouTube series